The 2015 season is Bangkok Glass's fifth season in the Thai Premier League, on the name of Bangkok Glass.

Pre-season and friendlies

Kor Royal Cup
Coke Charity Cup. It's a match between Buriram United the 2014 Toyota Thai Premier League's champions VS. Bangkok Glass the 2014 Thaicom FA Cup's champions at Supachalasai Stadium, Bangkok, Thailand.

Thai Premier League

AFC Champions League

Thai FA Cup
Chang FA Cup

Thai League Cup
Toyota League Cup

Squad statistics

Transfers
First Thai footballer's market is opening on 6 November 2014 to 28 January 2015

Second Thai footballer's market is opening on 3 June 2015 to 30 June 2015

In

Out

Loan out

References

2015
Bangkok Glass